Exeter Airport  is a public use airport located three nautical miles (6 km) south of the central business district of Exeter, a city in Tulare County, California, United States.

Facilities and aircraft 
It has one runway designated 13/31 with an asphalt/treated surface measuring 2,800 by 40 feet (853 x 12 m).

For the 12-month period ending January 9, 2009, the Exeter airport had 400 general aviation aircraft operations, an average of 33 per month. At that time, there were three single-engine aircraft based at this airport.

History 
During World War II, the Exeter airport was designated as Hunter Auxiliary Field (A-1). It was used by the United States Army Air Forces as an auxiliary training airfield for the flying school at Rankin Field, California.

See also

 California World War II Army Airfields

References 

 www.airfieldsdatabase.com

External links 
 Aerial photo as of 4 September 1994 from USGS The National Map

Airports in Tulare County, California
Airfields of the United States Army Air Forces in California